Keinton Mandeville railway station was a small railway station situated on the Great Western Railway's Langport and Castle Cary Railway. It served the medium-sized village of Keinton Mandeville in the South Somerset district of Somerset, England.

The station opened on 1 July 1905, at the same time as Castle Cary and Charlton Mackrell. This was because the three stations were used collectively as a temporary branch before the railway opened officially as a whole the following year.

Before its closure in 1962, the station had two platforms and there was a station building, as well as a small goods yard, behind the east platform.

No sign of the station now remains; however the line itself is still in use as part of the Reading to Taunton Line.

Services

References

Disused railway stations in Somerset
Railway stations in Great Britain opened in 1905
Railway stations in Great Britain closed in 1962
Former Great Western Railway stations